Cavos or Kavos, family name
Cavos is a beach resort on Angistri Island in Greece.
Kavos or Cavos is a town on the Greek island Corfu